Elections were held in Illinois on Tuesday, November 8, 1938.

Primaries were held April 12, 1938.

Election information
1938 was a midterm election year in the United States.

Turnout
In the primary election 2,550,642 ballots were cast (1,744,005 Democratic and 806,637 Republican).

In the general election 3,274,814 ballots were cast.

Federal elections

United States Senate 

Incumbent Democrat William H. Dieterich retired. Democrat Scott W. Lucas was elected to succeed him.

United States House 

All 27 Illinois seats in the United States House of Representatives were up for election in 1938.

Republicans flipped four Democratic-held seats, making the composition of Illinois' House delegation 17 Democrats and 10 Republicans.

State elections

Treasurer 

Incumbent Treasurer John C. Martin, a Democrat serving his second nonconsecutive term, did not seek reelection, instead opting to run for United States congress. Democrat Louie E. Lewis was elected to succeed him.

Democratic primary

Republican primary
Incumbent congressman William G. Stratton won the Republican nomination.

General election

Superintendent of Public Instruction 

Incumbent first-term Superintendent of Public Instruction John A. Wieland, a Democrat, won reelection.

Democratic primary

Republican primary

General election

Clerk of the Supreme Court 

Incumbent first-term Clerk of the Supreme Court, Democrat Adam F. Bloch, was reelected.

Democratic primary

Republican primary

General election

State Senate
Seats in the Illinois Senate were up for election in 1938. Democrats retained control of the chamber.

State House of Representatives
Seats in the Illinois House of Representatives were up for election in 1938. Republicans flipped control of the chamber.

Trustees of University of Illinois

An election was held for three of nine seats for Trustees of University of Illinois. All three Democratic nominees won.

Incumbent first-term Democrats Orville M. Karraker and Karl A. Meyer were reelected. New Democratic member Frank A. Jensen was also elected.

Incumbent Democrat was Nellie V. Freeman was not renominated.

Judicial elections

Supreme Court
On June 27, 1938, one district of the Supreme Court of Illinois had a special election.

3rd district special election
A special election was held for the seat of the court's 3rd district, after the death in office of Lott R. Herrick. Republican Walter T. Gunn won the election.

Ballot measure
One ballot measure was put before voters in 1938, a legislatively referred constitutional amendment

Illinois Banking Amendment 
The Illinois Banking Amendment, a proposed legislatively referred constitutional amendment to Sections 5, 6, 7 and 8, of Article XI of the 1870 Illinois Constitution, failed to meet the threshold for approval. In order to be approved, legislatively referred constitutional amendments required approval equal to a majority of voters voting in the entire general election.

If approved, this amendment would have made modifications to state banking rules that would have reduced the liability of bank stockholders.

Advisory referendum
One advisory referendum ("question of public policy") was put before voters.

National Draft for War on Foreign Soil Question 
An advisory question was voted on, which asked voters whether the states United States congressmen should vote against a national military draft. Those who voted overwhelmingly instructed congressmen to vote against a national military draft.

Local elections
Local elections were held.

References

 
Illinois